Bernard Farebrother (1846 - 1888) was an organist and composer based in Birmingham.

Life

He studied organ in Norwich with Zechariah Buck. After a career as an organist which had some notable incidents, including being sacked from his employment in Warwick, he committed suicide aged 40.

Appointments

Organist of Collegiate Church of St Mary, Warwick 1867 - 1871
Organist of St Paul's Church, Birmingham
Organist of Holy Trinity Church, Birchfields

Works

His compositions include the following songs: 
Across the sea
Annabel Lee
Gentle spring
Hymn to the Night
Maid of Athens
The Great God Pan

He also wrote a Piano Sonata, Plein de Doute.

References

1847 births
1888 deaths
English organists
British male organists
English composers
19th-century British composers
19th-century English musicians
19th-century British male musicians
19th-century organists